Beyond the Last Light is the third studio album by American rock band Comes with the Fall.

Critical reception
Music critic Greg Prato wrote in AllMusic:

Track listing 
All tracks by William DuVall, except where noted.

Personnel 

Comes with the Fall
 Bevan Davies — drums
 William DuVall — vocals, guitar
 Adam Stanger — bass guitar
Additional performers
 Matthew Cowley - percussion on "Black Cross"
 Noah Pine - piano on "Still Got a Hold on My Heart"

Production
Produced by William DuVall
Engineered by Jeff Bakos
Mastered by Stephan Marsh

References 

2007 albums
Comes with the Fall albums